Dargu Shomali (also Romanized as Dargū Shomālī; also known as Dargoo, Dargu, and Darkū-ye Shemālī) is a village in Cheghapur Rural District, Kaki District, Dashti County, Bushehr Province, Iran. At the 2006 census, its population was 53, in 9 families.

References 

Populated places in Dashti County